Mural cells are the vascular smooth muscle cells (vSMCs), and pericytes, of the microcirculation. Both types are in close contact with the endothelial cells lining the capillaries, and are important for vascular development and stability. Mural cells are involved in the formation of normal vasculature and are responsive to factors including platelet-derived growth factor B (PDGFB) and vascular endothelial growth factor (VEGF). The weakness and disorganization of tumor vasculature is partly due to the inability of tumors to recruit properly organized mural cells.

Cell type controversy 

Mural cells were described for the first time in the late 19th century as contractile cells lining up around the endothelium. In reality, it was a variety of cells that had been observed and bundled up under the common name of Rouget cells. Later studies brought controversy about their contractility, and this remains an elusive point today.

Pericytes, vSMCs, and many other perivascular cell types  express very similar markers such as Platelet Derived Growth Factor Receptor Beta (PDGFR-B), aminopeptidase-N (CD13), chondroitin sulfate proteoglycan 4 (Ng2), or desmin, which makes their identification difficult and requires a combination of markers: for example vSMCs but not pericytes express alpha-smooth muscle actin (ACTA2). Nowadays, distinctively characterizing these cells requires a combination of markers, cellular location and morphology.

Lineage and zonation of mural cells 
Typically, vSMCs wrap around larger vessels: they form a dense continuum spindling around arteries, arterioles and precapillary arterioles; while around postcapillary venules, vSMCs adopt a different morphology: individual cell bodies extending thing branching processes, that become more stellate-like around venules and veins.

The cell body of pericytes has a round shape extending a few processes in a longitudinal fashion along the capillaries.

Recently, efforts have been undertaken using single cell sequencing on mural cells to try to characterize their molecular signature along the blood vessels. This showed that there is a zonation in their expression patterns by which they can be grouped into different subsets, but no singular markers have been found so far that can identify unequivocally any of the cell types.

See also 
List of human cell types derived from the germ layers

References 

Animal cells